Daī-ghî tōng-iōng pīng-im (Taiwanese phonetic transcription system, abbr: DT) is an orthography in the Latin alphabet for Taiwanese Hokkien based upon Tongyong Pinyin. It is able to use the Latin alphabet to indicate the proper variation of pitch with nine diacritic symbols.

Phonology 

DT in its present form has 17 initials, 18 finals and 8 tones.

Tone number 
Taiwanese is a tonal language, so the pitch (tone) of a spoken word affects its meaning, same as the written words. However, in non-tonal languages, a word's pitch constantly conveys emotion but often does not influence its meaning. In Taiwanese, which has nine tones and two extra tones, neutral tone and nasal vowel.

Tone definition

Tone marks 
Tones are expressed by diacritics; checked syllables (i.e. those ending with glottal stops) are followed by the letter h. Where diacritics are not technically available, e.g. on some parts of the internet, tone alphabet may be used instead.

 a (1st tone; yinping)
 à (2nd tone; yingshang)
 a̠ (3rd tone; yinqu)
 ā (ptkh) (4th tone; yinru)
 ă (5th tone; yangping)
 ä (6th tone; yangshang)
 ā (7th tone; yangqu)
 a (ptkh) (8th tone; yangru)
 á (9th tone; high rising)
 å (neutral tone)
 aⁿ (ann) (nasal vowel)

Examples for these tones: ciūⁿ (elephant), bâ (leopard), bhè (horse), di (pig), zŭa (snake), āh (duck), lok (deer). And, a neutral tone, sometimes indicated by å(aj) in DT, has no specific contour; its pitch always depends on the tones of the preceding syllables. Taiwanese speakers refer to this tone as the "neutral tone".

Tone sandhi 
Tone sandhi or chain shift by circulation, as the tones are encoded by appending and modifying spellings with attention to the rules of the DT system. The basic tone has no modification and tone mark. Generally speaking, the basic tone means the 7th tone (mid even tone; yangqu).

Morphology 
A DT word, like an English word, can be formed by only one syllable or several syllables, with the two syllables being the general typicality.  Each syllable in DT follows one of the six underlying patterns:

Alphabet 
The DT alphabet adopts the Latin alphabet of 19 letters, 4 digraphs, and 6 diacritics to express the basic sounds of Taiwanese:

Initials 
bh, z, c, gh, h, r, g, k, l, m, n, ng, b, p, s, d, t

Note that unlike their typical interpretation in modern English language, bh and gh are voiced and unaspirated, whereas b, g, and d are plain unvoiced as in Hanyu Pinyin. p, k, and t are unvoiced and aspirated, corresponding closer to p, t, and k in English. It is inconsistent with the use of h's in the Legge romanization and the use of the diacritic in the International Phonetic Alphabet to signal consonantal aspiration.

Finals 
Vowels: a, i, u, e, or, o
Diphthongs: ai, au, ia, iu, io, ui, ua, ue
Triphthongs: iau, uai
Nasals: m, n, ng

The nasals m, n, and ng can be appended to any of the vowels and some of the diphthongs.
In addition, m and ng can function as independent syllables by themselves.

The stops h, g, b and d can appear as the last letter in a syllable, in which case they are pronounced with no audible release.  (The final h in DT stands for a glottal stop.)

Delimiting symbols 
All syllables in each word are normally separated by the dash (-) mark. Generally, syllables before the dash which must undergo tone sandhi.

DT examples

Universal Declaration of Human Rights

Greeting of Voyager Golden Record

Notes 

Languages of Taiwan
Romanization of Hokkien
Pinyin